Neubrandenburg Burning (German - Das brennende Neubrandenburg) is an 1830-1835 oil on canvas painting by Caspar David Friedrich, now in the Hamburg Kunsthalle. It is also known as Sunrise at Neubrandenburg (Sonnenaufgang bei Neubrandenburg) or Sunset at Neubrandenburg (Sonnenuntergang bei Neubrandenburg). The artist's parents were both born in Neubrandenburg and he often painted it - another example is Neubrandenburg.

See also
List of works by Caspar David Friedrich

References

External links

Paintings in the Hamburger Kunsthalle
Paintings by Caspar David Friedrich
1830s paintings